Jean-François-Henri Collot (Pont-d’Arches, near Charleville-Mézières 26 January 1716 – October 1804 in Mesnil, near Châlons-sur-Marne) was an 18th-century French homme de lettres and encyclopédiste.

Collot devoted to the cultivation of letters the leisure that allowed him the occupation of commissary of war, a position that he filled successively in Grenoble, Rennes and Nancy.

André-Joseph Collot was his brother.

Publications 
 Mémoire sur les invalides, in Encyclopédie by Diderot, entry « invalides ». Collot proposes to distribute in rural communities invalids yet ready to marry and make their marriage a duty in order to repopulate the countryside.
 Mémoire sur la vie parmi les troupes, écrit de façon à être lu dans un couvent de religieuses, 1769, in-8°.
 Satires en vers sur les innovations dans le ministère, Bâle, 1774, in-8°.
 L’Officier français à l’armée, opéra comique mixed with ariettes, Grenoble, 1780, in-8°.
 Épître à M. Gellée, médecin à Châlons, en vers, dans l’Annuaire du département de la Marne, année 1803.

Sources 
 Jean-Baptiste-Joseph Boulliot, Biographie ardennaise ou Histoire des Ardennais qui se sont fait remarquer par leurs écrits, leurs actions, leurs vertus et leurs erreurs, en 2 volumes, Paris, 1830, vol.1,  . 
 Ferdinand Hoefer, Nouvelle Biographie générale, t. 11, Paris, Firmin-Didot, 1856, .

External links 
Jean-François-Henri Collot on Wikisource

18th-century French writers
18th-century French male writers
18th-century French dramatists and playwrights
French opera librettists
Contributors to the Encyclopédie (1751–1772)
1716 births
1804 deaths